Lissette (born March 10, 1947), is a singer, songwriter, and record producer from Cuba. She is best known for recording a Spanish language-version of Bonnie Tyler's "Total Eclipse of the Heart" in 1985.

Lissette could refer to:

Given names

 Lissette Ochoa, victim of the eponymous domestic violence case
 Lissette Martinez (born 1971), the lead electrical engineer for the Space Experiment Module program at the Wallops Flight Facility (WFF)
 Lissette Hanley, fictional character of the Command & Conquer Red Alert 3 video game
 Lissette Garcia (born May 3, 1985), an American television personality and beauty pageant titleholder from Miami, Florida
 Lissette Antes (born 2 May 1991), is Ecuadorian freestyle wrestler
 Lissette Cuza (born 26 February 1975 in Marianao), a retired Cuban athlete who specialized in the long jump
 Lissette Solorzano, a professional photographer born in Santiago de Cuba in 1969
 Lissette Diaz (born 1983), an American actress, model and beauty pageant contestant who represented the United States in Miss World 2005
 Lissette Melendez (born 1967), an American freestyle/Latin pop/dance-pop singer

Middle names

 Marjorie Lissette de Sousa Rivas (born 23 April 1980), a Venezuelan actress and model of Portuguese descent
 Justine Lissette Pasek (born 27 August 1979), a Polish-Panamanian model, philanthropist, and beauty pageant titleholder who was crowned Miss Universe 2002
 Jean Lissette Aroeste  (born 2 October 1932), a former University of California librarian and Star Trek fan who became one of four writers with no prior television writing credits

Last names

 Allen Lissette (6 November 1919 – 24 January 1973), a New Zealand cricketer who played in two Tests in 1956

See also 
 Lisette (disambiguation)
 Lizzie